Bellshill is a village in Northumberland, in England. It is situated to the south-west of Bamburgh, inland from the North Sea coast.

Governance 
Bellshill is in the parliamentary constituency of Berwick-upon-Tweed.

Villages in Northumberland